Slugging, also known as casual carpooling, is the practice of forming ad hoc, informal carpools for purposes of commuting, essentially a variation of ride-share commuting and hitchhiking. A driver picks up these non-paying passengers (known as "slugs" or "sluggers") at key locations, as having these additional passengers means that the driver can qualify to use an HOV lane or enjoy toll reduction. While the practice is most common and most publicized in the congested Washington, D.C. metropolitan area, slugging also occurs in San Francisco, Houston, and other cities.

Background
In order to relieve traffic volume during the morning and evening rush hours, high-occupancy vehicle (HOV) lanes that require more than one person per automobile were introduced in many major American cities to encourage carpooling and greater use of public transport, first appearing in the Washington D.C. metropolitan area in 1975. The failure of the new lanes to relieve congestion, and frustration over failures of public-transport systems and high fuel prices, led to the creation in the 1970s of "slugging", a form of hitchhiking between strangers that is beneficial to both parties, as drivers and passengers are able to use the HOV lane for a quicker trip. While passengers are able to travel for free, or cheaper than via other modes of travel, and HOV drivers sometimes pay no tolls, "slugs are, above all, motivated by time saved, not money pocketed". Concern for the environment is not their primary motivation; Virginia drivers of hybrid automobiles are, for example, eligible to use HOV lanes with no passengers.

In the Washington area—with the second-busiest traffic during rush hour in the United States and Canada —slugging occurs on Interstates 95, 66 and 395 between Washington and northern Virginia.  As of 2006, there were about 6,459 daily slugging participants there.

In the San Francisco Bay Area, with the third-busiest rush hour, casual carpooling occurs on Interstate 80 between the East Bay and San Francisco.  As of 1998, 8,000 to 9,000 people slugged in San Francisco daily.  However, after bridge tolls were levied on carpool vehicles in 2010, casual carpooling saw a significant decline and etiquette became more uncertain.

Slugging also occurs in tenth-busiest Houston, at a rate of 900 daily in 2007, and in Pittsburgh.

Slugging is shown to be effective in reducing vehicle travel distance as a form of ridesharing.

Slugging is more used during morning commutes than evening commutes.  The most common mode that slugging replaces is transit bus.

David D. Friedman's The Machinery of Freedom proposed a similar system (which he referred to as "jitney transit") in the 1970s. However, his plan assumed that passengers would be expected to pay for their transit, and that security measures such as electronic identification cards (recording the identity of both driver and passenger in a database readily available to police, in the event one or both parties disappeared) would be needed in order for people to feel safe. Although slugging is informal, ad hoc, and free, in 30 years no violence or crime was reported from Washington D.C. slugging until October 2010, when former Sergeant Major of the Army Gene McKinney struck one of his passengers with his car after they threatened to report his reckless driving to the police.

Etymology
The term slug (used as both a noun and a verb) came from bus drivers who had to determine if the people waiting at the stop were genuine bus passengers or merely people wanting a free lift, in the same way that they look out for fake coins—or "slugs"—being thrown into the fare-collection box.

General practices
In practice, slugging involves the creation of free, unofficial ad hoc carpool networks, often with published routes and pick-up and drop-off locations. In the morning, sluggers gather at local businesses and at government-run locations such as park and ride-like facilities or bus stops and subway stations with lines of sluggers. Drivers pull up to the queue for the route they will follow and either display a sign or call out the designated drop-off point they are willing to drive to and how many passengers they can take; in the Washington area the Pentagon—the largest place of employment in the United States, with 25,000 workers—is a popular destination. Enough riders fill the car and the driver departs. In the evening, the routes reverse.

Many unofficial rules of etiquette exist, and websites allow sluggers to post warnings about those who break them. Some Washington D.C. rules are:

 The slug first in line gets the next ride to their destination and also gets to choose the front or back seat. Slugs should never take a ride out of turn.
 Drivers are not to pick up sluggers en route to or standing outside the line, a practice referred to as "body snatching".
 A woman is not to be left in the line alone, for her safety.
 No eating, smoking, or putting on of makeup is allowed.
 The driver has full control of the radio and climate controls.
 Windows may not be opened unless the driver approves.
 No money is exchanged or requested, as the driver and slugs all benefit from slugging.
 Driver and passengers say "Thank you" at the end.

Government involvement
While local governments sometimes aid sluggers by posting signs labeled with popular destinations for people to queue at, slugging is organized by its participants and no slug line has ever been created by government. Slug lines are organized and maintained by volunteers. Government officials have become more aware of sluggers' needs when planning changes that affect their behavior, and solicit their suggestions.  The Virginia Department of Transportation even includes links on their governmental webpage regarding slugging.

Other countries
In Jakarta, "car jockeys" are paid by commuters to ride into the center of the city to permit the use of high-occupancy vehicle lanes.

In India, it is illegal for drivers to randomly pick up commuters from the public roads and there is evidence that such drivers have been fined.

In the Polish People's Republic, hitchhiking was officially supported by the government (and formalized), and in Cuba, government vehicles are obligated to take hitchhikers, but these systems have nothing to do with high-occupancy lanes.

See also
 Ridesharing company
 Flexible carpooling
 Uber

References

Further reading
 
 
 
 
 
 FHWA Casual Carpooling Scan Report

Hitchhiking
Transportation in Washington, D.C.
Commuting
Culture of Washington, D.C.
Carsharing